Fernando Von Krannichfeldt (born 18 February 1940) is a Swiss former footballer who played in the 1960s as striker.

Von Krannichfeldt played for Mendrisiostar and then joined FC Basel's first team during their 1960–61 season under trainer Jenö Vincze. After one test match, Von Krannichfeldt played his domestic league debut for the club in the home game at the Landhof on 19 April 1961 as Basel won 2–0 against Lausanne-Sport. He scored his first goal for his club just one week later, on 26 April in the away game against Grasshopper Club as Basel won 4–2. In fact he scored two goals in this game.

Between the years 1960 and 1965, Von Krannichfeldt played a total of 35 games for Basel scoring a total of nine goals. 19 of these games were in the Nationalliga A, two in the Swiss Cup, one in the Cup of the Alps, six in the International Football Cup and seven were friendly games. He scored six goals in the domestic league, one in the Swiss Cup, one in the International Football Cup and the other goal was scored during the test games.

After his time with Basel, Von Krannichfeldt moved on to play for Baden in the Nationalliga B, the second tier of Swiss football.

References

Sources
 Die ersten 125 Jahre. Publisher: Josef Zindel im Friedrich Reinhardt Verlag, Basel. 
 Verein "Basler Fussballarchiv" Homepage

FC Mendrisio players
FC Basel players
FC Baden players
Swiss men's footballers
Association football forwards
1940 births
Living people